Bousov is a municipality and village in Chrudim District in the Pardubice Region of the Czech Republic. It has about 200 inhabitants.

Administrative parts
The village of Tuchov is an administrative part of Bousov.

Notable people
Jiří Schelinger (1951–1981), singer

Gallery

References

External links

Villages in Chrudim District